Tetsuo Satō may refer to:

, Japanese rower
, Japanese volleyball player